Sena IV was King of Anuradhapura in the 10th century, whose reign lasted from 972 to 975. He succeeded Udaya III as King of Anuradhapura and was succeeded by his brother Mahinda IV.

See also
 List of Sri Lankan monarchs
 History of Sri Lanka

References

External links
 Kings & Rulers of Sri Lanka
 Codrington's Short History of Ceylon

Monarchs of Anuradhapura
S
S
S